Burey Bhi Hum Bhale Bhi Hum is an Indian comedy-drama television series on Star Plus. The series premiered on 16 March 2009 and ended on 26 June 2009. It was produced by JD Majethia and Aatish Kapadia under the banner Hats Off productions.

Plot
Based on Gujarati backdrop, it features the story of two brothers who live together in a same house with their families.

Cast
Firoz Irani ... Ambalal Popat (the head of the family)
Arvind Vaidya ... Pranlal Kaka (Ambalal's best Friend)
Ashiesh Roy ... Mansukh Popat(Ambalal's older son)
Monoj Goel ... Bhallu Popat(second son of Ambalal)
Harshada Khanvilkar ... Rasila (Mansukh's wife)
Priti Joshi ... Sushila (Bhallu's wife)
Piyush Ranade ... Kaivalya (Mansukh's elder son)
Shital Thakkar ... Jyotika Kaivalya Popat (Kaivalya's wife)
Srman Jain ... Baabli (Mansukh's younger son)
Ashutosh Kulkarni ... Jai (Bhallu's youngest son)
Parakh Madan ... Krishna (jai's wife)
Shruti Bapna ... Hetal (Bhallu's daughter)
Ritu Parmar ... Yashvi (daughter of Kevailya and Jyotika)
Prasad Barve ... Barkiya (House servant)
Bijal Batvia ... Gargi (daughter of Mansukh)
Nitin Jain ... Gourang (husband of Gargi)
Rocky Verma ... Tapori ... Goon

Production
Speaking about the series, Vivek Bahl, Senior Creative Director of Star Plus said, "Burey Bhi Hum Bhale Bhi Hum is a Gujarati family drama revolving around characters we will love... and love to hate. With the launch of Burey Bhi Hum, Bhale Bhi Hum, we aim to give our viewers even more variety in our prime time line-up."

In May 2009, some of the cast members were fasting in real during a fasting sequence in the series. In the same month on 27, the series which aired at 7:30 pm (IST) was shifted half an hour early due to low viewership compared to rival shows in the same slot.

Reception
Hindustan Times stated, "One family is very nice, the other family is not at all nice. They all look like they should be in a saas-bahu (mother in law- daughter in law) soap (in terms of their clothes, etc), and they’re not that funny, but hey, it’s a comedy."

References

StarPlus original programming
Indian drama television series
Indian television series
Indian comedy television series
2009 Indian television series debuts
2009 Indian television series endings
Hats Off Productions